Cisaucula is a monotypic moth genus of the family Noctuidae described by Todd in 1910. Its only species, Cisaucula peruviana, was first described by Herbert Druce in 1910. It is found in Peru.

References

Agaristinae
Monotypic moth genera